Events from the 1390s in Denmark.

Incumbents 
 Monarch – Margaret I of Denmark

Events 

1391
  Queen Margaret I takes possession of Hørningsholm (later Hirschholm Palace) north of Copenhagen.

1397
 17 June  The coronation of Eric of Pomerania.
 25 September – The Treaty of Kalmar is signed uniting the kingdoms of Denmark, Norway, and Sweden under the Kalmar Union.

Births

Deaths 
 15 August 1399  Ide Pedersdatter Falk, landholder and the founder of a convent (born 1358)

References 

1390s in Denmark